Banca Agricola Mantovana S.p.A. (BAM) was an Italian bank based in Mantua, Lombardy. The bank was a subsidiary of Banca Monte dei Paschi di Siena. On 31 March 2008, the bank had a total assets of €13,502,864,975.

History
Found 1871 as Banca Agricola Provinciale Mantovana, Banca Agricola Mantovana (BAM) was a cooperative bank based in Mantua. In 1932 Banca Mutua Popolare di Mantova was merged with Banca Agricola Mantovana. In 1989 the bank absorbed Banca Operaia di Bologna.

In 1998, the bank formed a joint venture agreement with Unipol in Quadrifoglio Vita, an insurance company that operated in BAM's network. BAM also acquired a minority ownership in Finsoe, the intermediate parent company of Unipol. As at 31 December 2000, BAM held 5.601% of Finsoe.

BAM was acquired by Banca Monte dei Paschi di Siena (Banca MPS) in 1999. Circa 1999–2000 the bank was changed from a cooperative society (S.C.) to a limited company (società per Azioni). In 2000 Banca MPS controlled 51.487% shares. It was increased to 52.311% in 2001 and 65.546% in 2002. In 2003 Banca MPS acquired 100% shares of BAM and Banca Toscana. Sanpaolo IMI was a minority shareholders of BAM for 8.49% as at 31 December 2001, which was sold to Banca MPS for €206 million.

On 21 September 2008 BAM was absorbed into Banca MPS. While Quadrifoglio Vita was transformed to a joint venture of AXA and Banca MPS in the same year, as well as Banca MPS sold all the shares of Finsoe, the parent company of Unipol.

Sponsorship
Banca Agricola Mantovana was the sponsor of the round 7 of 1984 Italian Formula Three season.

Foundation
In 2000 Banca Agricola Mantovana and Banca Monte dei Paschi di Siena established Fondazione Banca Agricola Mantovana, an independent charity organization.

See also

 Banca Popolare di Mantova

References

External links
 Borsa Italiana archive 
 

Defunct banks of Italy
Former Montepaschi subsidiaries
Banks established in 1871
Italian companies established in 1871
Banks disestablished in 2008
Italian companies disestablished in 2008
Companies based in Mantua
Defunct cooperative banks of Italy
Companies formerly listed on the Borsa Italiana